Chaskel may refer to:
 Chaskel Besser (1923 - 2010), Orthodox rabbi
  (born 1932), Jewish German-Chilean film director; see Jackal of Nahueltoro

See also 
 Haskell (disambiguation)
 Sassoon Eskell
 Bernhard von Eskeles

Jewish given names
Jewish surnames